Christelle Bosker is a paralympic athlete from South Africa, competing mainly in category F37 throwing events.

Bosker competed in all three throws at the 2000 Summer Paralympics, winning gold in both the discus and javelin and finishing third in the shot put, just two centimetres behind the winner Joanne Bradshaw of the host nation Australia.

References

Paralympic athletes of South Africa
Athletes (track and field) at the 2000 Summer Paralympics
Paralympic gold medalists for South Africa
Paralympic bronze medalists for South Africa
Living people
Medalists at the 2000 Summer Paralympics
Year of birth missing (living people)
Paralympic medalists in athletics (track and field)
South African female discus throwers
South African female javelin throwers
South African female shot putters
21st-century South African women